Shandon Rovers were a Gaelic Athletic Association club located in Dungarvan, County Waterford. They formed in 1895.

References

 Festival to honour 19th century footballer, The Irish Times.
 Dan Fraher, Waterford County Museum.

External links
 Team photo

Gaelic games clubs in County Waterford